Sean Michael Teague (born December 19, 1970, in Houston, Texas) is an American voice actor and ADR script writer for Funimation and OkraTron 5000. He has provided voices for a number of English-language versions of Japanese anime films and television series.

Teague is involved in many varied projects which speak to his love and passion for all aspects of the entertainment industry.  For example, on October 10, 2010, he launched his first website, Sequel Central, which is designed as a news and information site for Hollywood film franchises including sequels, prequels, spinoffs, reboots, remakes, and adaptations.

Filmography

Anime
 Bamboo Blade - Danjūrō Eiga
 BECK: Mongolian Chop Squad - Kigata (Ep. 20)
 Big Windup! - Ren Mihashi
 Birdy the Mighty Decode: 02 - Yang (Ep. 3)
 Case Closed - Michael Stewart, others (FUNimation dub)
 Corpse Princess - Sumitori
 Dragon Ball series - Uub
 Dragon Ball Z Kai - Uub
 Fairy Tail - Uosuke
 The Galaxy Railways - Ohyama (Ep. 16)
 Jormungand: Perfect Order - Maurice
 Jyu Oh Sei - Thor Klein (Teen)
 Karneval - Nai
 Last Exile: Fam, the Silver Wing - Lucciola
 The Legend of the Legendary Heroes - Shuss Shiraz
 Michiko & Hatchin - Lenine (Ep. 15)
 Nobunagun - Antoni Gaudi
 Oh! Edo Rocket - Shinza
 Ōkami-san and her Seven Companions - Hansel
 One Piece - Dip (Ep. 101), Race (FUNimation dub)
 Peach Girl - Yujio
 Ping Pong: The Animation - Mōri
 Romeo x Juliet - Benvolio
 Samurai 7 - Okamoto Katsushiro
 Save Me! Lollipop - Nanase
 Sekirei: Pure Engagement - Ashikabi Escapee (Ep. 1)
 Sengoku Basara: Samurai Kings - Harukichi (Ep. 13)
 Sengoku Basara: Samurai Kings 2 - Miyamoto Musashi
 Shakugan no Shana II - Yuri Chvojka
 Shigurui: Death Frenzy - Suzunosuke Kondou
 Soul Eater - Boy (Ep. 11)
 Toriko - Fond de Buono
 Trinity Blood - Wilhelm
 Yu Yu Hakusho - Koenma

Production Credits

Script Adaptation
 All Purpose Cultural Cat Girl Nuku Nuku DASH!
 AM Driver
 B'tX
 Baki the Grappler
 BECK: Mongolian Chop Squad
 Beet the Vandel Buster
 Case Closed
 Dragon Ball (series)
 Negima!
 One Piece
 Ouran High School Host Club
 Shuffle!
 Slayers Return
 SoltyRei
 The Tower of Druaga (anime)
 Trinity Blood
 xxxHolic

References

External links

Sequel Central, Sean's website devoted to information about upcoming Hollywood projects.

1970 births
Living people
American male voice actors
Male actors from Texas
American television writers
American male television writers
American male screenwriters